Thomas Kessler (born 25 September 1937 in Zurich) is a Swiss composer. He is a pioneer of electronic music

Life 

Kessler studied literature at the Universities of Zurich and Paris, followed by composition studies with Heinz Friedrich Hartig, Ernst Pepping and Boris Blacher at the Hochschule für Musik Berlin.

In 1965 he founded his own electronic studio and became a member of the Gruppe Neue Musik Berlin. He encountered composers such as Luc Ferrari and Vinko Globokar. Later he was director of the Elektronik Beat Studio Berlin as well as director of music at the Centre Universitaire International de Formation et de Recherche Dramatiques in Nancy.

From 1973 to 2000 Thomas Kessler taught composition and music theory at the Musik-Akademie der Stadt Basel and created there the Elektronische Studio Basel. His students include Wolfgang Heiniger, Max E. Keller, Bettina Skrzypczak, René Wohlhauser und Thomas Chr. Heyde.

Together with Gérard Zinsstag he founded the Tage für Neue Musik in Zürich and with Wolfgang Heiniger the Festival ECHT!ZEIT in Basel. Since 2001 he has been Composer in Residence at the New Music Concerts in Toronto.
In 2018 he was awarded the Schweizer Musikpreis.

References 

1937 births
Swiss composers
Swiss male composers
Living people